Imma xantharcha is a moth in the family Immidae. It was described by Edward Meyrick in 1906. It is found on Borneo.

The wingspan is about 19 mm. The forewings are dark purple-fuscous, irregularly strewn with yellow-ochreous scales between the veins and with a short orange line beneath the costa from the base. The hindwings are fuscous, thinly scaled towards the base, the terminal third suffused with 
dark fuscous.

References

Moths described in 1906
Immidae
Moths of Asia
Taxa named by Edward Meyrick